The 1979–80 season was the 78th in the history of the Western Football League.

The league champions for the second time in their history were Barnstaple Town. The champions of Division One were Melksham Town.

This season marked a return to the system of two points for a win, after five seasons using the three-point system. The Western League returned to the three-point system after ten seasons, in 1989–90.

Premier Division
The Premier Division remained at twenty clubs after Glastonbury and Shepton Mallet Town were relegated to the First Division, and two clubs joined:

A.F.C. Bournemouth Reserves, champions of the First Division.
Portway Bristol, runners-up in the First Division.

League table

First Division
The First Division increased from nineteen to twenty-two clubs after A.F.C. Bournemouth Reserves and Portway Bristol were promoted to the Premier Division. Five new clubs joined:

Bath City Reserves, returning to the league after leaving in 1971.
Glastonbury, relegated from the Premier Division.
Liskeard Athletic, from the South Western League.
Radstock Town, from the Somerset Senior League – returning to the league after leaving in 1960.
Shepton Mallet Town, relegated from the Premier Division.

League table

References

1979-80
5